The NASCAR All-Star Race, formerly known as The Winston from 1985 to 2003, the Nextel All-Star Challenge from 2004 to 2007, the Sprint All-Star Race from 2008 to 2016, and the Monster Energy NASCAR All-Star Race from 2017 to 2019, is an annual NASCAR Cup Series stock car exhibition race between race winners from the previous season and the beginning of the current season, as well as all past event winners, and previous NASCAR Cup Series champions who attempted to run the entire previous season. Two other ways to become eligible to race in the event are winning one of the three stages in the All-Star Open (a race for drivers not eligible for the main event), or by winning the fan vote.

History
The first running of the race was held in 1985 at NASCAR's longest and fastest non-restrictor-plate superspeedway Charlotte Motor Speedway (briefly renamed Lowe's Motor Speedway from 1999, before reverting to the original in 2009) and has been run there every year until 2019, except in 1986 when it was run at Atlanta Motor Speedway. Michael Waltrip became the first driver to win the All-Star race after transferring in from a qualifying race in 1996. Until 2001, the rule restricted only champions of the past five All Star Challenge events, but in 2005, the rule became the winners in the past ten years of either the NASCAR Cup Series or the All-Star Race. For 2015, the full-time drivers who have won a NASCAR Cup Series or All-Star Race are now exempt, regardless of when they won the race.  The All-Star Open (formerly the "Showdown" from 2008 to 2016; the Open name was also used under Winston and Nextel sponsorships) was restricted to the top 50 drivers in either the final standings of the previous year or current standings in the current year. From 2000 to 2002, and again starting in 2015, two qualifying races are implemented.

In 2004, Nextel, predecessor to Sprint, added a vote of race spectators, internet users and Sprint cellphone users to add one additional driver not in the field, but in the Showdown, and finishing on the lead lap, to the final starting field. For 2008, the event's name featured the use of the edition of the race in Roman numerals, with the 2008 race's official name being the "Sprint All-Star Race XXIV". Also, the fan entry driver was changed, with the new formula coming from those attending races up to that point, Sprint retail locations and double votes from Sprint subscribers. In 2014, the Showdown race was moved to the night preceding the All-Star Race. To replace the event, Charlotte Motor Speedway president, Marcus Smith announced that qualifying for the All-Star Race will take place shortly before the main event.

In 2020, the race was moved to Bristol Motor Speedway on July 15 as COVID-19 pandemic prevented Charlotte from accommodating fans. The venue changed again in 2021 to Texas Motor Speedway, which replaced its spring date with the All-Star Race. The venue will change once more in 2023 as, thanks to NASCAR's 75th anniversary, the All-Star Race will be held at North Wilkesboro Speedway.

Format history

One segment (1985–1986)
The twelve race winners from the 1984 season participated in the inaugural running of The Winston at Charlotte Motor Speedway. The race was 70 laps with one pit stop required. It was held the day before the Coca-Cola World 600. A $10,000 bonus was paid to the leader of Lap 20 for leading that lap.  Terry Labonte won that bonus.

From its first year, the unique moniker "The Winston" was adopted by sponsor R. J. Reynolds. Rather than referring to the event as a traditional "All star" race, no generic reference was included in the title. Due to limitations on television tobacco advertising, other races which involved tobacco title sponsorship utilized generic names on network television. For example, on ABC, the Winston 500 was called the "Talladega 500" and the Marlboro 500 was called the "Michigan 500." Without a generic alternative, television and other media were forced to acknowledge Winston as the title sponsor, effectively skirting, and pushing the limits of tobacco advertising regulation. The event is however referred as "The All-Star" in NASCAR Thunder 2003 and NASCAR Thunder 2004, EA Sports' games based on the last seasons of Winston title sponsorship.

The race moved to Atlanta International Raceway in 1986, with a 200 kilometer format of 83 laps (126.326 miles) on Mother's Day, a day typically avoided on the NASCAR calendar. Like its previous counterpart, green flag pit stops were mandatory, and only winners from the 1985 season were eligible. Only nine different drivers won a race in 1985, so the highest placed non-winner in final 1985 points, Geoffrey Bodine, was added to the field for an even 10 cars. A 100-lap (152.2 miles) consolation race for the rest of the drivers, the Atlanta Invitational was held the same day. It featured only thirteen participants, and was won by Benny Parsons. A lackluster crowd of only 18,500 attended the second edition of The Winston, with only twenty-three cars racing in the two races combined.

Three Segments — 75 Laps, 50 Laps, 10 Green Laps (1987–1989)
The race returned to Charlotte with a new 135-lap (202.5 mile), three-segment format which reflected on NASCAR's short-track roots. A new date was introduced, the weekend before the Coca-Cola 600, which gave teams a popular two weeks of festivities, known locally and by both die-hard fans and teams as "The Two Weeks of Speed" at what is generally considered most teams' home track. Live national television coverage on ABC would also be featured for the first of four years. This format consisted of a 75-lap first segment, with a mandatory green flag pit stop, a 50-lap second segment, and a 10-green flag lap final sprint. Each segment would be separated by a ten-minute break.

In addition to the race format, the method for choosing participants changed. The 20-driver field consisted of the past nineteen race winners, regardless of season. The remaining drivers would participate in a 100-lap, last-chance race, the Winston Open, with the winner advancing to the final starting position.

In 1989, qualifying for the starting lineup for The Winston changed to a three-lap time trial with the fastest lap key and a quick-pit two-tire pit stop.

Segment 1: 75 Laps / Mandatory green-flag pit stop
Segment 2: 50 Laps
Segment 3: 10 Green Flag Laps (No caution laps count)

Two Segments — 50 Laps, 20 Laps (1990–1991)
After a pair of controversial dashes in the past three years which infuriated fans, the race was cut to two segments of 50 and 20 laps to prevent some of the reckless driving, giving the race its 70-lap total distance which would be used until 2001.

The ten-minute break was installed between segments.

Two changes were made in qualification in 1991. Automatic berths were given only to race-winning drivers and owners in 1990 and 1991 up until The Winston. Also, The Winston Open was reduced to 50 laps, with the winner automatically advancing to the Winston. To guarantee 20 cars in the Winston field, it would be filled out by the top finishers (e.g., 2nd, 3rd, etc.) in the Winston Open advancing to the main event until the field reached 20 cars.

ABC carried the race in 1990, with the Winston Open finish, and CBS carried both the Open and The Winston in 1991. In 1991, to add to the day of events, the NASCAR Legends Race was held on a quarter-mile oval paved between the Charlotte Motor Speedway Dog-Leg front stretch, or quad-oval, and between the first and second pit row sections. Elmo Langley won the exhibition event featuring retired NASCAR champions and stars.

Segment 1: 50 Laps
Segment 2: 20 Laps

70 Laps — 30 Laps, 30 Laps, 10 Green Laps (1992–1997)
The race was moved up one day to Saturday night, and it moved to live coverage on The Nashville Network. The Winston revived the controversial 10-lap shootout, and The Winston Open went to a short 30-lap format. The 1992 race marked the first superspeedway race held under-the-lights, and resulted in a spectacular finish. Davey Allison and Kyle Petty battled on the last lap, and crashing crossing the finish line. Allison won the race, but spent the evening in the hospital rather than victory lane.

The 1994 was the only running won by a tire brand (Hoosier) other than Goodyear, as Geoff Bodine held off Sterling Marlin and Ken Schrader.  The event's second segment saw numerous crashes, notably when Ernie Irvan wrecked coming to the yellow to end the second segment.

The 1995 race featured Dale Earnhardt's trend-setting Special paint scheme car. A tradition made famous by Jeff Gordon and sponsor DuPont starting in 1996 with the Jurassic Park themed scheme and first of many traditional "Special Themes" used by  Gordon and Hendrick teammates, before widespread adoption by additional teams.

The field would be inverted after the first segment, and like the previous years, a 10-minute break would be featured between segments.

Former NASCAR Champions were automatically invited to the race, as were the past five years' winners of this race.

After Michael Waltrip's win by being the last car to transfer from The Winston Open, NASCAR changed the procedure by reverting to a format featuring the 1996 and 1997 race winning drivers and owners, and then adding the preceding year's race winning drivers not yet in the field until the field reached 19, and then the winner of The Winston Open. If the number added to the previous year reached over 19, then all drivers who won races that year would be in the field.

Segment 1: 30 Laps / Full Inversion
Segment 2: 30 Laps
Segment 3: 10 Green Flag laps (No caution laps count)

70 Green Laps — 30 Laps, 30 Laps, 10 Laps (1998–2001)
The race remained at its 70 lap format, but for 1998, only green flag laps would count in any segment, not just the third segment.

The second ten-minute break was eliminated and replaced with caution laps, and cars would have the option of pitting for tires and fuel, at the expense of losing track position.

The inversion is changed to a random draw between 3 and 12 cars for the inversion after the first segment.

In 1998, qualifying for The Winston Open was changed. Previously it was accomplished with one-lap qualifying runs. From 1998 to 2000, the No Bull 25 Shootout twin races determined the lineups. Practice speeds (odd/even) from earlier in the day set the field for two 25-lap sprint races. The finish order for the first 25 set the odd positions for the Winston Open, and the finish order for the second 25 set the even positions for the Winston Open. In 2001, The Winston Open reverted to single-car qualifying, best of two laps.

In 2000–2002, immediately following The Winston Open, a 16-lap "No Bull 5 Sprint" last-chance race was added. The winner of the sprint race would also advance to The Winston.

In 2001, television coverage moved to FX as part of the new NASCAR television contract, and qualifying was changed so the pit stop took place at the start of the qualifying, and the stop was a four-tire change instead of two.

Starting in 2001, crew members were introduced together with drivers during the driver introduction ceremonies, with Fox broadcasters Chris Myers and Jeff Hammond interviewing selected persons during the ceremony.

Segment 1: 30 Green Flag laps (no caution laps count)
Segment 2: 30 Green Flag laps (no caution laps count) / Pit stops optional (cars lose track position if they pit)
Segment 3: 10 Green Flag laps (no caution laps count)

90 Laps — 40 Laps, 30 Laps, 20 Green Laps — With Elimination (2002–2003)
The popularity of the reality show Survivor influenced Winston to make changes to the format in 2002, adding a new elimination format ("Survival of the Fastest"), and the final segment returned to 20 laps to make tire wear an issue.

Only race winning drivers and owners from 2001 would be in the field, and all former Cup titleholders and the past five winners of The Winston would be added to the field, plus the winner of the qualifying races.

The No Bull Sprint was eliminated after 2002, and for 2003, The Winston Open would become a 20-lap race with pit stops, and then a 10 green flag lap sprint after pit stops.

If the caution flag waved on Lap 40 of the first segment, two green flag laps or the next yellow flag would be run to finish the segment.

In The Winston, only the top 20 cars advanced to the second segment, and 10 cars (in 2002) or 14 cars (in 2003 planned, but was 12 after crashes) advanced to the third segment.

A green flag pit stop for four tires was mandatory in the first segment, but after Frank Stoddard beat the system in 2002 by changing four tires on the car driven by Jeff Burton just feet from the finish line on the last lap, the rule was changed to mandating tire stops at a specific point in the race.

Also, the inversion is moved to the final 20 lap sprint, and the ten-minute break is restored between the second and final segment.

Segment 1: 40 Laps / Must take a four-tire pit stop during race (In 2003, must be between Laps 10–30) / only top 20 cars advance.
Segment 2: 30 Laps / Only 14 cars (2003) / 10 cars (2002) advance / full field inversion at end of segment
Segment 3: 20 Green Flag Laps (no caution laps count)

90 Laps — 40 Laps, 30 Laps, 20 Green Laps (2004–2006)
When Nextel took over title series title sponsorship from RJ Reynolds in 2004, the race name was changed using the previous de facto "All-Star Race" moniker which newer fans had been using since FX began broadcasting ran the event live and as an RJR brand, conflicted with new the sponsorship, officially becoming The Nextel All-Star Challenge. The format was changed slightly while the race stayed at 90 laps.

The elimination was eliminated, 1998–2001 inversion and second segment to third segment break rules were restored, meaning a random inversion and an open pit road for the final break instead of a ten-minute break.

The four tire stop is now between Laps 13 and 16.

Segment 1: 40 Laps / with random inversion (6–12) at end of segment / 10 Minute Break
Segment 2: 30 Laps / Pit stops optional (cars lose track position if they pit)
Segment 3: 20 Green Flag Laps (no caution laps count)

80 Laps — Four 20-Lap Quarters (2007)

Starting with the 2007 race, held May 19, 2007, there were major changes.

Announced during the Media Tour in Charlotte on January 23, 2007, the annual Pit Crew Challenge, held May 16, 2007, at Charlotte Bobcats Arena, won by Ryan Newman's crew in 2007, not only gave each member of the crew $10,000 each, but gave the driver the first choice of pit box, instead of the usual post-qualifying selection.  The unique three-lap qualifying (with a pit stop to change four tires) remained in place to determine the starting lineup, with $50,000 for the winner, $10,000 for second, and $5,000 for third, with the pit crew receiving half of the winner's share.

Three drivers from the Nextel Open event, a 40-lap race with two 20-lap segments, gained entry to the Challenge.  The top two finishers of the Open plus the leading fan vote winner still on the lead lap joined the automatic entries from past decade's All-Star race winners and active Cup Champions, along with the winners of the previous year's and first eleven Nextel Cup races of the current season.  Winners of those first eleven races in that season were also eligible for the following season's All-Star event.  In addition, as part of NASCAR's new television agreements, coverage was moved from FX to Fox sibling network Speed. The race format also changed as well.

The main race was shortened to eighty laps with four twenty-lap segments (or "quarters" like in football or basketball; only green flag laps will count in the final quarter).  After the first segment, a five-lap caution period starts and there is an opportunity for drivers to take an optional pit stop.  After the second segment, there is a ten-minute "halftime" break so pit crews can make adjustments. Unlike past events though, there is no inversion of the field. Finally, after the third segment, there is a five lap caution period so team can make a required pit stop (for work on their cars or a "stop and go" akin to a speeding penalty on pit row) for all teams which will determine the running order before the Dash for Cash, namely the $1 million (US) grand prize.

First quarter: 20 laps / optional pit stop during five-lap caution period.  $75,000 for the winner, $20,000 for second, and $10,000 for third.
Second quarter: 20 laps / ten-minute "halftime" break to make adjustments; no inversion of the field.   $75,000 for the winner, $20,000 for second, and $10,000 for third.
Third quarter: 20 laps / mandatory pit stop (or "stop and go" in 2007) during five-lap caution period.
Fourth quarter: 20 green flag laps.

100 Laps — Four 25-Lap Quarters (2008)

The changes to Sprint All-Star Race XXIV from XXIII was not only the name change with Roman numerals akin to the Super Bowl, and the first All-Star Race utilizing the Car of Tomorrow template, but also an expansion of the race by 25%.  Each quarter now had five more laps to race, which changes the complexion of each segment, as tire wear will become a greater factor as well as fuel mileage would become more of an issue throughout the race.  The 2007 race with its 20-lap segments was treated more of a sprint race;  the 2008 race with 25-lap segments means a car will use nearly one-half tank of fuel and cycle the tires through one half of a tire run.

It also changed the final pit stop as all cars must pit for fuel and tires since a stop and go during the mandatory pit stop will virtually be impossible because it would be very close to the limit (about 55–60 laps) for fuel, and tire wear became an issue as cars are set up for a fairly long run.

The qualifying race also featured a name change, to the Sprint Showdown (the qualifier reverted to the "Open" name with the Monster Energy sponsorship in 2017). All prize money remained unchanged for that year's race.

100 Laps — 50 Laps, 20 Laps, 20 Laps, 10 Green Flag Laps (2009–2011)

For the 25th anniversary of the race, two of the more popular elements of the classic format returned for this special edition.

The first segment became a 50-lap quarter, with a mandatory pit stop taking place in Lap 25 of the segment, the pit stop must be a four-tire Stop and take place during a green flag condition.  Following the first two segments, cars will have the option of pitting, but they will lose track position should they do so.

The second and third segments were twenty laps each, returning to the 2007 format.  Following the end of the third segment, a ten-minute break took place, allowing for adjustment of cars preceding the final segment,  a ten-green flag lap shootout.  The popularity of the double-file restarts throughout the race led NASCAR to adopt the rule for the second half of the 2009 season.

 Segment 1: 50 Laps with a 4 tire pit stop on lap 25
 Segment 2: 20 Laps/optional pit stops during the Caution
 Segment 3: 20 Laps followed by a ten-minute Break for adjustments/Mandatory 4 tire stop during Caution
 Segment 4: 10 Laps in a Dash for the cash (No Caution Laps Count)

90 Laps — Four Segments of 20 Laps, then 10 Green Flag Laps (2012–2014)

The 28th running (2012) came with a slight twist to the format.

For the first time in the race's history, there were five segments run in the race, four of them for 20 laps and concluding with a 10-lap sprint. The format was changed to provide additional incentive to win one of the first four segments, as the four segment winners will line up 1–4 to start the mandatory pit stop with the rest of the field lined up according to how they finished segment 4. Otherwise, the format, including eligibility criteria, remained unchanged. After winning the First Segment in 2012 Jimmie Johnson intentionally rode in the back for the next three segments. Matt Kenseth and Brad Keselowski did the same after winning Segments 2 and 3 respectively. Criticism to this practice resulted in the final segment pit stop changed from Segment winners to the drivers with the best average finish in Segments 1–4. The same year the pit stop was made for a mandatory 4-tire change. Track owner Bruton Smith promised a bonus million dollars if a driver could win all five segments. This has not been achieved yet.

In 2014, NASCAR changed qualifying from a single car two-lap run to a group qualifying effort with two (on short tracks and road courses) or three (On bigger tracks) rounds. All-Star Race qualifying remained the same. The Showdown was moved to Friday as well as the Fan Vote announcement so they can compete for practice and qualifying.

110 Laps — Four Segments of 25 Laps, then 10 Green Flag Laps (2015)

In 2015, NASCAR made a slight modification to the All-Star Race.  The ten-year rule for former Series and All-Star Race champions was replaced with a rule allowing a full-time driver who has won either to have a "lifetime" exemption provided they race full-time.  Also, for the Showdown, the "No Bull Sprint" format returned.  The first segment was 20 laps, then the winner advanced to the All-Star Race.  The second segment was 20 laps in which only Green Flag laps counted, that winner advanced.  The winners joined the Fan Vote winner, Danica Patrick.

The 5 segment format from 2012 to 2014 was kept with 5 Laps added to each segment for the All-Star Race, making each segment 25 laps. After the first four segments, drivers were lined up to enter pit road based on their average finish over the course of the first four segments. All drivers entered pit road for a mandatory 4-tire change before the final 10 lap segment in which only Green Flag laps counted.

113 Laps — Two segments of 50 Laps, then 13 Green Flag Laps (2016)

Known as the "Brad Keselowski Rule" for the driver whose idea it was designed, the race would return, in its 30th year as a multi-segment race, to a three-segment format.  The first two segments were to be 50 laps, which would effectively require a pit stop in each segment (cars can make 50-55 laps per green flag run).  The pit stop had to be performed under green flag conditions and a two (or more) tire change is required. During the second segment, the stop had to be before lap 35.

At the end of the first segment, a minimum of two tires were required to be changed during the pit stop.  Following the end of the second segment, a random draw determined whether nine, ten, or eleven cars would be forced conduct a four-tire pit stop.  Those cars were required to line up behind the cars that did not pit. Cars below that mark could pit but had to line up after the cars that made a mandatory pit stop.

Keselowski said the thirteen green flag lap segment was set because the NASCAR Drivers Council considered factors regarding pit stops and how many laps it would take to come back to the front, which would be around 10-15 laps, so 13 was chosen.

The Showdown and fan vote also changed for 2016.  In addition to the old "No Bull Sprint" format, a third segment of ten laps was added.  A two tire stop was required between segments.  The winner of each Showdown segment advanced to the All-Star Race, and skips the remaining two segments.

The fan vote allowed two drivers to transfer the main event.  Originally scheduled for one driver voted by the fan vote, the rules called for a second in 2016 because of a quirk in the eligibility.  There were 16 drivers eligible for the All-Star Race, so the rules were designed so the three Showdown winners and the fan vote winner would make it 20.  With Jeff Gordon, eligible by the November 2015 Martinsville win, retired, the runner-up in the fan vote was chosen to advance.  If special circumstances warranted the withdrawal of another eligible driver, the third (and subsequent) placed driver in the fan vote would have also advanced.

Past winners

NASCAR All-Star Race
The practice of using Roman numerals to identify each race began in 2008, but ended one year later.

All-Star Race Notes
2001: Race started on May 19 but ended early morning May 20 due to rain delay.
2018, 2019, & 2022: Race ran extra laps due to overtime on a segment.
2020: Race postponed from May 16 to July 15 and moved to Bristol Motor Speedway due to the COVID-19 pandemic.

Multiple winners (drivers)

Multiple winners (teams)

Manufacturer wins

All-Star Open

All-Star Open Notes
2016:  Race postponed from Friday, May 20 to Saturday, May 21 because of inclement weather.
2019: Race ran extra laps due to overtime on two segments.
2020: Race postponed from May 16 to July 15 due to the COVID-19 pandemic.

No Bull Sprint
All races were held at Charlotte Motor Speedway.

No Bull 25 Shootout
Twin 25-lap races to determine the starting grid for the Winston Open. The starting lineups of the shootouts were based on practice speeds earlier in the day. In 2001, the starting grid for the Winston Open reverted to two-lap qualifying.

All races were held at Charlotte Motor Speedway.

Fan vote

Past pole winners

NASCAR All-Star Race
Starting in 1989, pole qualifying for race changed. During the three-lap run, teams are required to perform a four-tire pit stop on either the first or the second lap.
1985 Terry Labonte
1986 Darrell Waltrip
1987 Bill Elliott 170.827
1988 Darrell Waltrip
1989 Terry Labonte
1990 Dale Earnhardt
1991 Davey Allison
1992 Davey Allison
1993 Ernie Irvan
1994 Rusty Wallace
1995 Bobby Labonte 139.817
1996 Jeff Gordon
1997 Bill Elliott 143.273
1998 Bill Elliott 142.084
1999 Bobby Labonte 146.830
2000 Bill Elliott
2001 Rusty Wallace 140.458
2002 Matt Kenseth 143.441
2003 Bill Elliott 131.502
2004 Rusty Wallace 130.647
2005 Ryan Newman 132.306
2006 Kasey Kahne 132.465
2007 Matt Kenseth 133.442
2008 Kyle Busch 132.835
2009 Jimmie Johnson 121.416
2010 Kurt Busch (qualifying rained out and set by the qualifying draw)
2011 Kyle Busch 135.916
2012 Kyle Busch 119.112
2013 Carl Edwards 145.556
2014 Carl Edwards 146.915
2015 Denny Hamlin 145.648
2016 Kevin Harvick (qualifying rained out and set by owner points)
2017 Kyle Larson 143.849
2018 Matt Kenseth 127.644
2019 Clint Bowyer 118.794
2020 Martin Truex Jr. (awarded by random draw)
2021 Kyle Larson (awarded by random draw)
2022 Kyle Busch

NASCAR All-Star Open
Through 1997, one-lap qualifying was utilized. From 1998 to 2000, a pair of qualifying races, the No Bull 25's, set the starting lineup. The use of one lap qualifying (best single lap of two) resumed in 2001.
1986 Kyle Petty
1987 Brett Bodine
1988 Ken Schrader 171.958
1989 Mark Martin
1990 Ernie Irvan
1991 Michael Waltrip
1992 Brett Bodine
1993 Jeff Gordon
1994 Joe Nemechek 181.519 (overall track record at time)
1995 Michael Waltrip
1996 Lake Speed 180.977
1997 Chad Little 181.220
1998 Jeremy Mayfield (won first No Bull 25 qualifying sprint race)
1999 Mike Skinner (won first No Bull 25 qualifying sprint race)
2000 Jerry Nadeau  (won first No Bull 25 qualifying sprint race)
2001 Johnny Benson 181.257
2002 Jeremy Mayfield 183.336
2003 Steve Park 184.244
2004 Dave Blaney 185.058
2005 Mike Bliss 189.208
2006 Scott Riggs 186.509
2007 Carl Edwards 187.487
2008 Elliott Sadler 185.014
2009 Kirk Shelmerdine (qualifying rained out and set by the qualifying draw)
2010 David Ragan (qualifying rained out and set by the qualifying draw)
2011 David Ragan 191.680
2012 A. J. Allmendinger 192.465
2013 Martin Truex Jr. 193.424
2014 Austin Dillon 194.616
2015 Paul Menard 189.673
2016 Chase Elliott (qualifying rained out and set by the 2016 Owner Point standings before the Showdown)
2017 Clint Bowyer 189.474
2018 Aric Almirola (qualifying rained out and set by the 2018 Owner Point standings before the Open)
2019 Daniel Hemric 182.168
2020 Michael McDowell (random draw)
2021 Tyler Reddick (Owner’s Points)
2022 Tyler Reddick 186.981

Race notes
Keith Jackson, much better known for his work on college football and ABC's Wide World of Sports, called the 1987 event, known for the "Pass in the Grass".  He was the network's NASCAR play-by-play announcer until the 1987 season.
From 1987 to 1990, ABC Sports covered reports on time trials on the Indianapolis 500 which ABC Sports covered.
The 1992 race was the first held on a superspeedway at night.
After the 2000 race, a pedestrian bridge collapsed outside one of the entrances to Lowe's Motor Speedway.  Over 100 spectators were injured, some of them critically.  Lawsuits related to the incident were heard in courts as late as 2007.  Bret Baier of Fox News Channel was the first reporter from a national (U.S.) television network to file reports from the scene; today, he is the host of FNC's Special Report with Bret Baier.
Trent Cherry, a member of the No. 12 Penske Racing Dodge crew, did a mosh pit dance into an infield crowd prior to the 2005 race.  The all-star race introductions since 2001 have included pit crew members, which has led to antics increasing between crew members as they are introduced in front of the crowd.
In 2006, the Red Hot Chili Peppers performed a concert between segments 2 and 3.  Among the celebrities that have given the command have included Pamela Anderson (2005) and Michael Jordan (2007).
Since 2005, NASCAR Day has been held the day before this race.  NASCAR Day is a charity event that benefits the NASCAR Foundation.  The foundation in turn funnels money to charities supported by drivers and team owners.
The NASCAR Hall of Fame induction ceremonies were held as part of Sprint All-Star Race XXVI week, which took shortly after the opening of the Hall.

American Challenge Cup
The NASCAR All-Star Race's roots are from the non-championship 1961–1963 Race of Champions at Daytona International Speedway. A 10-lap, 25-mile All-Star event was held in conjunction with the Speedweeks activities. Like the first two runnings of the NASCAR All-Star Race, only winners of the previous season participated in this event.

References

External links
NASCAR All-Star Race at Charlotte Motor Speedway's website

1985 establishments in North Carolina
All-star games
 
 
 
 
 
NASCAR Cup Series races
Recurring sporting events established in 1985
Annual sporting events in the United States